Thomas Bryant (2 March 1933 – 21 December 2012) was a South African cricketer. He played one first-class match for Northerns in 1954/55.

References

External links
 

1933 births
2012 deaths
South African cricketers
Northerns cricketers
Cricketers from Durban